Brigadier-General Shaheed Jamil Uddin Ahmed (1 February 1936 - 15 August 1975) was a career officer in the Pakistan Army Signal Corps and then the Bangladesh Army. Appointed as the military secretary to the President of Bangladesh in 1973, he was killed in the early hours of 15 August 1975, while he was on his way to aid the then President, Sheikh Mujibur Rahman who was assassinated that night during a military coup.  In 2010, Ahmed was posthumously promoted to the rank of brigadier general and awarded the Bir Uttom, Bangladesh's second highest military honour.

Biography
He was born on 1 February 1936 in Gopalganj. After completing B.Sc. in physics, he joined PMA Kakul in 1958 and was commissioned into the Signals Regiment in 1960. He served for a time in the Military Intelligence Branch in 1963–1964. He was a Major and Officer Commanding, Signals Bravo Coy, 6th Infantry Brigade, 7th Infantry Division at Bajaur. He was relieved of his command on 29 March 1971 and transferred as Logistics Officer to Division Headquarters. Soon thereafter, on 18 April 1971 he was interned like other Bengali officers and spent rest of the war in military internment. He was part of the Bengali officers repatriated to Bangladesh in February 1972.

Career
He was made a Lt.Colonel in 1972 and appointed as DGFI. Promoted to Colonel in 1973. Appointed as the military secretary to the President of Bangladesh. The then President, Sheikh Mujibur Rahman called him for aid when his house was attacked by mutineers. He rushed towards road 32, Dhanmondi which was Mujib's residence armed only with his side arm. On the way he meet Presidential guard regiment soldiers. He asked them to move towards the president's house but they were reluctant. He then rushed ahead alone. He was killed in the early hours of 15 August. Sheikh Mujib was assassinated on 15 August.  In 2010, Ahmed was posthumously promoted to brigadier general and awarded the Bir Uttam, Bangladesh's second highest military decoration.

Personal life
He was the husband of the late Anjuman Ara Jamil, former Member of Parliament for Kushtia, Meherpur and Chuadanga.

References

1936 births
1975 deaths
Bangladesh Army colonels
People murdered in Bangladesh
Recipients of the Bir Uttom
1975 murders in Bangladesh
Deaths by firearm in Bangladesh